Spin squeezing is a quantum process that decreases the variance of one of the angular momentum components in an ensemble of particles with a spin. The quantum states obtained are called spin squeezed states. Such states can be used for quantum metrology, as they can provide a better precision for estimating a rotation angle than classical interferometers.

Mathematical definition 
Spin squeezed states for an ensemble of spins have been defined analogously to squeezed states of a bosonic mode. A quantum state always obeys the Heisenberg uncertainty relation

The state is spin-squeezed in the -direction, if the variance of the -component is smaller than the square root of the right-hand side of the inequality above

It is important that  is the direction of the mean spin. A different definition was based on using states with a reduced spin-variance for metrology.

Applications in quantum metrology 
Spin squeezed states can be used to estimate a rotation angle with a precision better than the classical or shot-noise limit. In particular, if the almost maximal mean spin points to the -direction, and the state is spin-squeezed in the -direction, then it can be used to estimate the rotation angle around the -axis. For instance, this can be used for magnetometry.

Relations to quantum entanglement 
Spin squeezed states can be proven to be entangled based on measuring the spin length and the variance of the spin in an orthogonal direction. Let us define the spin squeezing parameter

,

where  is the number of the spin- particles in the ensemble. Then, if  is smaller than  then the state is entangled. It has also been shown that a higher and higher level of multipartite entanglement is needed to achieve a larger and larger degree of spin squeezing.

Experiments with atomic ensembles 

Experiments have been carried out with cold or even room temperature atomic ensembles. In this case, the atoms do not interact with each other. Hence, in order to entangle them, they make them interact with light which is then measured. A 20 dB (100 times) spin squeezing has been obtained in such a system. Simultaneous spin squeezing of two ensembles, which interact with the same light field, has been used to entangle the two ensembles. Spin squeezing can be enhanced by using cavities.

Cold gas experiments have also been carried out with Bose-Einstein Condensates (BEC). In this case, the spin squeezing is due to the interaction between the atoms.

Most experiments have been carried out using only two internal states of the particles, hence, effectively with spin- particles. There are also experiments aiming at spin squeezing with particles of a higher spin. Nuclear-electron spin squeezing within the atoms, rather than interatomic spin squeezing, has also been created in room temperature gases.

Creating large spin squeezing 

Experiments with atomic ensembles are usually implemented in free-space with Gaussian laser beams. To enhance the spin squeezing effect towards generating non-Gaussian states, which are metrologically useful, the free-space apparatuses are not enough. Cavities and nanophotonic waveguides have been used to enhance the squeezing effect with less atoms.   
For the waveguide systems, the atom-light coupling and the squeezing effect can be enhanced using the evanescent field near to the waveguides, and the type of atom-light interaction can be controlled by choosing a proper polarization state of the guided input light, the internal state subspace of the atoms and the geometry of the trapping shape. Spin squeezing protocols using nanophotonic waveguides based on the birefringence effect and the Faraday effect have been proposed. By optimizing the optical depth or cooperativity through controlling the geometric factors mentioned above, the Faraday protocol demonstrates that, to enhance the squeezing effect, one needs to find a geometry that generates weaker local electric field at the atom positions. This is counterintuitive, because usually to enhance atom-light coupling, a strong local field is required. But it opens the door to perform very precise measurement with little disruptions to the quantum system, which cannot be simultaneously satisfied with a strong field.

Generalized spin squeezing 

In entanglement theory, generalized spin squeezing also refers to any criterion that is given with the first and second moments of angular momentum coordinates, and detects entanglement in a quantum state. For a large ensemble of spin-1/2 particles a complete set of such relations have been found, which have been generalized to particles with an arbitrary spin. Apart from detecting entanglement in general, there are relations that detect multipartite entanglement. Some of the generalized spin-squeezing entanglement criteria have also a relation to quantum metrological tasks. For instance, planar squeezed states can be used to measure an unknown rotation angle optimally.

References 

Quantum information science
Quantum optics